The 2010–11 Danish Superliga season was the 21st season of the Danish Superliga championship, which decides the Danish football championship. It began on 17 July 2010 with the previous season's silver medalists from Odense facing Esbjerg and ended on 29 May 2011 with six simultaneous matches. F.C. Copenhagen secured the title when Odense lost 1-2 to Nordsjælland on 21 April 2011, for their ninth Danish championship.

Twelve teams were taking part in the tournament, facing each other three times for 33 matches total.

For the first time since the 1999–2000 Danish Superliga, the top two teams entered the qualification for the UEFA Champions League.

Teams 

The top ten teams from the last season' Superliga and the top two teams from the last season's First Division participated.

League table

Results

Matchday 1–11

Matchday 12–33

Top goalscorers
Correct as of 19 May 2011

Managerial changes

References 

Danish Superliga seasons
1
Denmark